When a work's copyright expires, it enters the public domain. The following is a list of works that entered the public domain in 2023. Since laws vary globally, the copyright status of some works are not uniform.

Countries with life + 70 years
With the exception of Belarus (Life + 50 years) and Spain (which has a copyright term of Life + 80 years for creators that died before 1987), a work enters the public domain in Europe 70 years after the creator's death, if it was published during the creator's lifetime. For previously unpublished material, those who publish it first will have the publication rights for 25 years. The list is sorted alphabetically and includes a notable work of the creator.

Countries with life + 60 years
In Bangladesh, India, and Venezuela a work enters the public domain 60 years after the creator's death.

Countries with life + 50 years
In most countries of Africa and Asia, as well as Belarus, Bolivia, New Zealand, Egypt and Uruguay, a work enters the public domain 50 years after the creator's death.

Countries with life + 80 years
Spain has a copyright term of life + 80 years for creators that died before 1987. In Colombia and Equatorial Guinea a work enters the public domain 80 years after the creator's death.

Australia and Canada

In 2004 copyright in Australia changed from a "plus 50" law to a "plus 70" law, in line with the United States and the European Union. But the change was not made retroactive (unlike the 1995 change in the European Union which bought some e.g. British authors back into copyright, especially those who died from 1925 to 1944). Hence the work of an author who died before 1955 is normally in the public domain in Australia; but the copyright of authors was extended to 70 years after death for those who died in 1955 or later, and no more Australian authors will come out of copyright until 1 January 2026 (those who died in 1955).

Similarly, Canada amended its Copyright Act in 2022 from a "plus 50" law to a "plus 70" law, coming into force on December 30, 2022, but does not revive expired copyright. No more new Canadian authors will come out of copyright until 1 January 2043 (those who died in 1972).

United States

Under the Copyright Term Extension Act, books published in 1927, films released in 1927, and other works published in 1927, entered the public domain in 2023.

Unpublished works whose authors died in 1952 entered the public domain.

Notable films entering the public domain in the United States include Metropolis, the first feature talkie The Jazz Singer, the first Academy Award for Best Picture winner Wings, the lost film London After Midnight, Sunrise: A Song of Two Humans, Napoléon, Alfred Hitchcock's first thriller The Lodger: A Story of the London Fog, and the Clara Bow star vehicle It.

Notable books entering the public domain in the United States include To the Lighthouse by Virginia Woolf, Steppenwolf by Hermann Hesse, The Bridge of San Luis Rey by Thornton Wilder, Show Boat by Oscar Hammerstein II and Jerome Kern, and the original versions of the first three books of The Hardy Boys.

The last two short stories in the Canon of Sherlock Holmes, written by Arthur Conan Doyle and subject to a copyright dispute by his estate, and H. Rider Haggard's final book about Allan Quatermain, Allan and the Ice-gods, entered the public domain in 2023.

See also
1952 in literature and 1972 in literature for deaths of writers
Public Domain Day
Creative Commons

References

External links
 
 
Popular Books of 1927 at Goodreads

Public domain
Public domain